Eucryphia falcata is an extinct species of flowering plant. It belongs to the genus Eucryphia within the family  	Cunoniaceae.

Description 
Macrofossils of compound leaves with an unknown number of total leaflets have been found. The lateral leaflets are falcate, and the terminal leaflet is symmetrical. It has a rounded base. The leaf margin had serrations. This is likely the plesiomorphic condition for all genera of the family Cunoniaceae. The leaves also had trichomes.

Etymology 
The specific epithet falcata is derived from the falcate, lateral leaflets of the compound leaves.

Temporal range 
This species lived during the late Paleocene, during the timeframe of 58.7 to 55.8 Ma. It is the oldest fossil Eucryphia species.

Distribution 
One fossil specimen has been found near Bunyan, New South Wales, Australia. The fossil was found in lake sediments of the Lake Bungarby, which is a terrestrial mudstone dating back to the Paleocene.

References

falcata
Extinct plants
Prehistoric plants
Fossils
Flora of Australia
Extinct species
Extinct taxa
Fossil taxa